The Miniature Altarpiece (or Miniature Altarpiece: Anna Selbdritt) in the Victoria and Albert Museum, London, is a small, 9.3 cm high, Gothic boxwood miniature triptych completed in the Netherlands c. 1500-1520. The central carving is made from boxwood and shows a relief of the Virgin and Child attended by two saints, thought to be Anne, who is shown with wings and holding a large crucifix, and James the Great who wears a hat and holds a staff. The outer semi-circular wings and shell are lined with silver and decorated with foliate designs. It stands on a silver plinth with pierced quatrefoils, and topped by a cherub's head and a statuette of God the Father.  It is thought the silver-work was added between 1550-1570.

Two lay figures keel at prayer desks before the saints; presumably there are the object's donors or commissioners. The man is on the viewers left is presented by St. James, the woman is on our right and presented by St. Michael.

It has the accession number 225-1866, having been acquired for £14 at the Le Charpentier sale at the Hôtel Drouot on 23 May 1866. There is no record of its provenance before this point. It is not currently on display.

Notes

External links

 Catalog entry at the Victoria and Albert Museum

Gothic boxwood miniature
Medieval European sculptures
Renaissance sculptures